Schwepnitz (German) or Sepicy (Sorbian) is a municipality in the district of Bautzen, in Saxony, Germany.

References 

West Lusatia
Populated places in Bautzen (district)